Odbojkaski Klub Sloboda Tuzla  is a female volleyball club from Tuzla, Bosnia and Herzegovina. It currently competes in the Premier League, the top tier volleyball league of Bosnia and Herzegovina. It is part of the RSD Sloboda Tuzla.

History
The club was founded in 2009. In season 2012-13 it won promotion to the top tier league.

Recent seasons
The recent season-by-season performance of the club:

Coaching history

 Almir Žilić
 Nihad Zahirović
 Armin Dervišević

References

Volleyball clubs established in 2009
Bosnia and Herzegovina volleyball clubs

Sport in Tuzla